Keratocephalus ("horned head") is an extinct genus of tapinocephalian therapsids from the early Capitanian age of South Africa. It was found in the Lower and Middle Tapinocephalus  Assemblage Zone of the Karoo deposits, in the Lower Beaufort Beds in Beaufort West

Description

Classification
Keratocephalus moloch, known from a number of greatly variable skulls, along with postcrania, from the Lower and Middle Tapinocephalus zone, shows considerable variability in the pachyostotic development. It may be not as derived as Tapinocephalus. The naso-frontal boss is raised into a sort of horn (hence the name - "horned head") and the length of the snout varies greatly. This in itself throws doubt on Boonstra'''s distinction between short and long-snouted forms. Pelosuchus'', known only on the basis of postcranial features, is a synonym.

Sources

Further reading

External links
 Tapinocephalidae at Paleos

Tapinocephalians
Prehistoric therapsid genera
Guadalupian synapsids
Guadalupian synapsids of Africa
Fossil taxa described in 1931
Taxa named by Friedrich von Huene
Capitanian genus first appearances
Capitanian genus extinctions